In Islam, Mūsā ibn ʿImrān is an important prophet and messenger of God and is the most frequently mentioned individual in the Quran, with his name being mentioned 136 times and his life being narrated and recounted more than that of any other prophet. He is one of the most important prophets and messengers of Islam.

According to the Quran, Musa was born to an Israelite family. In his childhood, he is put in a basket which flows towards Nile, and eventually Musa is discovered by Pharaoh's wife Asiya, who makes Musa as her adopted son. After reaching adulthood, Musa then resides in Midian, before departing for Egypt again to threaten the Pharaoh. During his prophethood, Musa is said to have performed many miracles, and is also reported to have personally talked to God, who bestows the title 'Speaker of God' upon Musa. The prophet's most popular miracle is him dividing the Red sea, with a miraculous staff provided by God. Apart from the Quran, Musa is also described and praised in the Hadith literature as well. After Pharaoh's death, Musa and his followers travel towards Jerusalem, where the prophet eventually dies. In Islamic tradition, he is believed to have been buried at Nabi Musa, and eventually raised towards the heavens. Afterwards, he is reported to have met Muhammad in the seven heavens following the latter's ascension from Jerusalem during the Night Journey. During the journey, Musa is said by Muslims to have repeatedly sent Muhammad back, and request a reduction in the number of required daily prayers, originally believed to be fifty, until only the five obligatory prayers remained.

Musa is viewed as a very important figure in Islam. According to Islamic theology, all Muslims must have faith in every prophet and messenger of God, which includes Musa and his brother Harun. The life of Musa is generally seen as a spiritual parallel to the life of Muhammad, and Muslims consider many aspects of the two individuals' lives to be shared. Islamic literature also describes a parallel relation between their people and the incidents that occurred in their lifetimes; the exodus of the Israelites from ancient Egypt is considered to be similar in nature to the migration of Muhammad and his followers from Mecca to Medina as both events unfolded in the face of persecution—of the Israelites by the ancient Egyptians, and of the early Muslims by the Meccans, respectively. His revelations, such as the Ten Commandments, which form part of the contents of the Torah and are central to the Abrahamic religions of Judaism and Christianity. Consequently, Jews and Christians are designated as "People of the Book" for Muslims and are to be recognized with this special status wherever Islamic law is applied. Musa is further revered in Islamic literature, which expands upon the incidents of his life and the miracles attributed to him in the Quran and hadith, such as his direct conversations with God.

Generally, Moses is seen as a legendary figure, whilst retaining the possibility that Moses or a Moses-like figure existed in the 13th century BCE.

Life

Childhood
According to Islamic tradition, Musa was born into a family of Israelites living in Egypt. Of his family, Islamic tradition generally names his father 'Imran, corresponding to the Amram of the Hebrew Bible, traditional genealogies name Levi as his ancestor. Islam states that Musa was born in a time when the ruling Pharaoh had enslaved the Israelites after the time of the prophet Yusuf (Joseph). Islamic literature states that around the time of Musa's birth, the Pharaoh has a dream in which he sees fire coming from the city of Jerusalem, which burns everything in his kingdom except in the land of the Israelites (another version says that the Pharaoh dreams of a little boy who catches the Pharaoh's crown and destroys it, although there is no authentic Islamic reference to whether the dreams actually occurred). When the Pharaoh is informed that one of the male children would grow up to overthrow him, he orders the killing of all newborn Israelite males in order to prevent the prediction from occurring. Experts of economics in Pharaoh's court advise him that killing the male infants of the Israelites would result in loss of manpower. Therefore, they suggest that male infants should be killed in one year but spared the next. Musa's brother, Harun, was born in the year when infants were spared, while Musa was born in the year when infants were to be killed.

Incident of the Nile

According to Islamic tradition, Jochebed, Musa's mother, suckles him secretly during this period. When they are in danger of being caught, God inspires her to put him in a wicker basket and set him adrift on the Nile. She instructs her daughter to follow the course of the ark and report back to her. As her daughter follows the ark along the riverbank, Musa is discovered by the Pharaoh's wife, Asiya, who convinces the Pharaoh to adopt him. When Asiya ordered wet nurses for Musa, Musa refuses to be breastfed. Islamic tradition states that this is because God forbids Musa from being fed by any wet nurse in order to reunite him with his mother. His sister worries that Musa has not been fed for some time, so she appears to the Pharaoh and informs him that she knows someone who can feed him. After being questioned, she is ordered to bring the woman being discussed. The sister brings their mother, who feeds Musa, and thereafter, she is appointed as the wet nurse of Musa.

Historicity

Prophethood

Test of prophecy 
According to Isra'iliyat hadith, when Musa is playing on the Pharaoh's lap in his childhood, he grabs the Pharaoh's beard and slaps him in the face. This action prompts the Pharaoh to consider Musa as the Israelite who would overthrow him, and the Pharaoh wants to kill Musa. The Pharaoh's wife persuades him not to kill him because he is an infant. Instead, he decides to test Musa. Two plates are set before young Musa, one containing rubies and the other glowing coals. Musa reaches out for the rubies, but the angel Gabriel directs his hand to the coals. Musa grabs a glowing coal and puts it in his mouth, burning his tongue. After the incident, Musa suffers a speech defect, but is spared by the Pharaoh.

Escape to Midian and Marriage 

After having reached adulthood, according to the Quran, Musa is passing through a city when he comes across an Egyptian fighting with an Israelite. The Israelite man is believed to be Sam'ana, known in the Bible to be a Samaritan, who asks Musa for his assistance against the Egyptian who is mistreating him. Musa attempts to intervene and becomes involved in the dispute. Musa strikes the Egyptian in a state of anger, which results in his death. Musa then repents to God, and the following day, he again comes across the same Israelite fighting with another Egyptian. The Israelite again asks Musa for help, and as Musa approaches the Israelite, he reminds Musa of his manslaughter and asks if Musa intended to kill the Egyptian. Musa is reported, and the Pharaoh orders Musa to be killed. However, Musa flees to the desert after being alerted to his punishment. According to Islamic tradition, after Musa arrives in Midian, he witnesses two female shepherds driving back their flocks from a well. Musa approaches them and inquires about their work as shepherds and their retreat from the well. Upon hearing their answers and about the old age of their father, Shuaib, Musa waters their flocks for them. The two shepherds return to their home and inform their father of Musa. They then invite Musa to a feast. At that feast, their father asks Musa to work for him for a period of eight years in return for marriage to one of his daughters. Musa consents and works for him for ten years.

Preaching

Call to prophethood

According to the Quran, Musa departs for Egypt along with his family after completing the contracted time period. During their travel, as they stop near At-Tur, Musa observes a large fire and instructs the family to wait until he returns with fire for them. When Musa reaches the Valley of Tuwa, God calls out to him from the right side of the valley from a tree, on what is revered as Al-Buq‘ah Al-Mubārakah ("The Blessed Ground") in the Quran. Musa is commanded by God to remove his shoes and is informed of his selection as a prophet, his obligation of prayer and the Day of Judgment. Musa is then ordered to throw his rod, which turns into a snake, and later instructed to hold it. The Quran then narrates Musa being ordered to insert his hand into his clothes and when he revealed it, it shines a bright light. God states that these are signs for the Pharaoh, and orders Musa to invite Pharaoh to the worship of one God. Musa expresses his fear of Pharaoh and requests God to heal his speech impediment and grant him Harun as a helper. According to Islamic tradition, both of them state their fear of Pharaoh, but are assured by God that He would be observing them and commands them to inform the Pharaoh to free the Israelites. Therefore, they depart to preach to the Pharaoh.

The Quran states that Musa was sent by God to confront the erstwhile (pharaoh) of ancient Egypt and to guide the Israelites, who were enslaved by the former. The Quran directly validates Musa and Harun as prophets chosen by God:

Arrival at Pharaoh's court
When Musa and Harun arrive in the court of Pharaoh and proclaim their prophethood to the Pharaoh, the Pharaoh begins questioning Musa about the God he follows. The Quran narrates that Musa answers the Pharaoh by stating that he follows the God who gives everything its form and guides them. The Pharaoh then inquires about the generations who passed before them, and Musa answers that knowledge of the previous generations is with God. The Quran also mentions the Pharaoh questioning Musa: “And what is the Lord of the worlds?” Musa replies that God is the lord of the heavens, the earth and what is between them. The Pharaoh then reminds Musa of his childhood with them and the killing of the man he has done. Musa admits that he has committed the deed in ignorance, but insists that he is now forgiven and guided by God. Pharaoh accuses him of being mad and threatens to imprison him if he continues to proclaim that the Pharaoh is not the true god. Musa informs him that he has come with manifest signs from God. When the Pharaoh demands to see the signs, Musa throws his staff to the floor, and it turns into a serpent. He then draws out his hand, and it shines a bright white light. The Pharaoh's counselors advises him that this is sorcery, and on their advice he summons the best sorcerers in the kingdom. The Pharaoh challenges Musa to a battle between him and the Pharaoh's magicians, asking him to choose the day. Musa chose the day of a festival.

Confrontation with sorcerers

When the sorcerers come to the Pharaoh, he promises them that they would be among the honored among his assembly if they won. On the day of the festival of Egypt, Musa grants the sorcerers the chance to perform first and warned them that God would expose their tricks. The Quran states that the sorcerers bewitch the eyes of the observers and cause them terror. The summoned sorcerers throw their rods on the floor, and they appear to change into snakes by the effect of their magic. At first, Musa becomes concerned witnessing the tricks of the magicians, but is assured by God to not be worried. When Musa does the same his rod, the serpent devours all the sorcerers' snakes. The sorcerers realize that they have witnessed a miracle. They proclaim belief in the message of Musa and fall onto their knees in prostration despite threats from the Pharaoh. The Pharaoh is enraged by this and accuses them of working under Musa. He warns them that if they insist in believing in Musa, he would cut their hands and feet on opposite sides, and crucify them on the trunks of palm trees for their betrayal of the Pharaoh. The magicians, however, remain steadfast to their newfound faith and are punished by Pharaoh.

Exodus

Plagues of Egypt
After losing against Musa, the Pharaoh continues to plan against Musa and the Israelites, ordering meetings with the ministers, princes and priests. According to the Quran, the Pharaoh is reported to have ordered his minister, Haman, to build a tower so that he "may look at the God of Musa". Gradually, the Pharaoh begins to fear that Musa may convince the people that he is not the true god, and wants to have Musa killed. After this threat, a man from the family of Pharaoh, who had years ago warned Musa, comes forth and warns the people of the punishment of God for the wrongdoers and reward for the righteous. The Pharaoh defiantly refuses to allow the Israelites to leave Egypt. The Quran states that God decrees punishments over him and his people. These punishments come in the form of floods that demolish their dwellings, swarms of locust that destroy the crops, pestilence of lice that makes their life miserable, toads that croak and spring everywhere, and the turning of all drinking water into blood. Each time the Pharaoh is subjected to humiliation, his defiance becomes greater. The Quran mentions that God instructs Musa to travel at night with the Israelites and warns them that they would be pursued. The Pharaoh chases the Israelites with his army after realizing that they have left during the night.

Dividing the sea 
Having escaped and now being pursued by the Egyptians, the Israelites stop when they reach the seafront. The Israelites exclaim to Musa that they would be overtaken by Pharaoh and his army. In response, God commands Musa to strike the Red Sea with his staff, instructing them not to fear being inundated or drowning in sea water. Upon striking the sea, Musa splits it into two parts, forming a path that allows the Israelites to pass through. The Pharaoh witnesses the sea dividing alongside his army, but as they also try to pass through, the sea closes in on them. As he is about to die, Pharaoh proclaims belief in the God of Musa and the Israelites, but his belief is rejected by God. The Quran states that the body of the Pharaoh is made a sign and warning for all future generations. As the Israelites continue their journey to the Promised Land, they come upon people who are worshipping idols. The Israelites request to have an idol to worship, but Musa refuses and states that the polytheists would be destroyed by God. They are granted manna and quail as sustenance from God, but the Israelites ask Musa to pray to God for the earth to grow lentils, onions, herbs and cucumbers for their sustenance. When they stop in their travel to the Promised Land due to lack of water, Musa is commanded by God to strike a stone, and upon its impact twelve springs came forth, each for a specific tribe of the Israelites.

Years in the wilderness

Revelation of the Torah

After leaving Egypt, Musa leads the Israelites to Mount Sinai (Tur). Upon arrival, Musa leaves the people, instructing them that Harun is to be their leader during his absence. Musa encountered Iblis at Mount Sinai and Musa asked him why he refused to prostrate before Ādam. Musa is commanded by God to fast for thirty days and to then proceed to the valley of Tuwa for guidance. God orders Musa to fast again for ten days before returning. After completing his fasts, Musa returns to the spot where he had first received his miracles from God. He takes off his shoes as before and goes down into prostration. Musa prays to God for guidance and begs God to reveal himself to him. It is narrated in the Quran that God tells him that it would not be possible for Musa to perceive God, but that He would reveal himself to the mountain, stating: "By no means canst thou see Me (direct); But look upon the mount; if it abide in its place, then shalt thou see Me." When God reveals himself to the mountain, it instantaneously turns into ashes, and Musa loses consciousness. When he recovers, he goes down in total submission and asks forgiveness of God.

Musa is then given the Ten Commandments by God as Guidance and as Mercy. Meanwhile, in his absence, a man named Samiri creates a Golden Calf, proclaiming it to be the God of Musa. The people begin to worship it. Harun attempts to guide them away from the Golden Calf, but the Israelites refuse to do so until Musa returns. Musa, having thus received the scriptures for his people, is informed by God that the Israelites has been tested in his absence, and they have gone astray by worshiping the Golden Calf. Musa comes down from the mountain and returns to his people. The Quran states that Musa, in his anger, grabs hold of Harun by his beard and admonishes him for doing nothing to stop them, but when Harun tells Musa of his fruitless attempt to stop them, Musa understands his helplessness, and they both pray to God for forgiveness. Musa then questions Samiri for creating the Golden Calf. Samiri replies that it had simply occurred to him, and he had done so. Samiri is exiled, and the Golden Calf is burned to ashes, and the ashes are thrown into the sea. The wrong-doers who have worshipped the Calf are ordered to be punished for their crime.

Musa then chooses 70 elites from among the Israelites and orders them to pray for forgiveness. Shortly thereafter, the elders travel alongside Musa to witness the speech between Musa and God. Despite witnessing the speech between them, they refuse to believe until they see God with their own eyes, so as punishment, a thunderbolt kills them. Musa prays for their forgiveness, and they are resurrected. They return to camp and set up a tent dedicated to worshiping God, as Harun had taught them from the Torah. They resume their journey towards the Promised Land.

The Israelites and the cow
Islamic exegesis narrates the incident of an old and pious man who lives among the Israelites and earns his living honestly. As he is dying, he places his wife, his little son, and his only possession—a calf in God's care—instructing his wife to take the calf and leave it in a forest. His wife does as she is told, and after a few years, when the son has grown up, she informs him about the calf. The son travels to the forest with a rope. He prostrates and prays to God to return the calf to him. As the son prays, the now-grown cow stops beside him. The son takes the cow with him. The son is also pious and earns his living as a lumberjack.

One wealthy man among the Israelites dies and leaves his wealth to his son. The relatives of the wealthy son secretly murder the son in order to inherit his wealth. The other relatives of the son come to Musa and ask for his help in tracing the killers. Musa instructs them to slaughter a cow, cut out its tongue, and then place it on the corpse; this would reveal the killers. The relatives do not believe Musa and do not understand why they are instructed to slaughter a cow when they are trying to find the killers. They accuse Musa of joking, but Musa manages to convince them that he is serious. Hoping to delay the process, the relatives ask the type and age of the cow they should slaughter, but Musa tells them that it is neither old nor young but in-between the two ages. Instead of searching for the cow described, they inquire about its colour, to which Musa replies that it is yellow. They ask Musa for more details, and he informs them that it is unyoked, and does not plow the soil nor does it water the tilth. The relatives and Musa search for the described cow, but the only cow that they find to fit the description belongs to an orphaned youth. The youth refuses to sell the cow without consulting his mother. All of them travel together to the youth's home. The mother refuses to sell the cow, despite the relatives constantly increasing the price. They urge the orphaned son to tell his mother to be more reasonable. However, the son refuse to sell the cow without his mother's agreement, claiming that he would not sell it even if they offered to fill its skin with gold. At this, the mother agrees to sell it for its skin filled with gold. The relatives and Musa consent, and the cow is slaughtered and the corpse is touched by its tongue. The corpse rises back to life and reveals the identity of the killers.

Meeting with Khidr 
One hadith recounts that when Musa is delivering an impressive sermon, an Israelite inquires if there were anyone more knowledgeable than him. When Musa denies any such person exists, he receives a revelation from God, which admonishes Musa for not attributing absolute knowledge to God and informs Musa that there is someone named Khidr who is more knowledgeable than him. Upon inquiry, God informs Musa that Khidr would be found at the junction of two seas. God instructs Musa to take a live fish and at the location where it would escape, Khidr would be found. Afterwards, Musa departs and travels with a boy named Yusha (Yeshua bin Nun), until they stop near a rock where Musa rests. While Musa is asleep, the fish escapes from the basket. When Musa wakes up, they continue until they stop to eat. At that moment, Yusha remembers that the fish had slipped from the basket at the rock. He informs Musa about the fish, and Musa remembers God's statement, so they retrace their steps back to the rock. There they see Khidr. Musa approaches Khidr and greets him. Khidr instead asks Musa how people are greeted in their land. Musa introduces himself, and Khidr identifies him as the prophet of the Israelites. According to the Quran, Musa asks Khidr: "Shall I closely follow you on condition that you teach me of what you have been taught?" Khidr warns that he would not be able to remain patient and consents on the condition that Musa would not question his actions.

They walk on the seashore and pass by a ship. The crew of the ship recognize Khidr and offer them to board their ship free of charge. When they are on the boat, Khidr takes an adze and pulls up a plank. When Musa notices what Khidr is doing, he is astonished and stops him. Musa reminds Khidr that the crew has taken them aboard for free. Khidr admonishes Musa for forgetting his promise of not asking. Musa states that he has forgotten and asks to be forgiven. When they leave the seashore, they pass by a boy playing with others. Khidr takes hold of the boy's head and kills him. Musa is again astonished by this action and questions Khidr regarding what he had done. Khidr admonishes Musa again for not keeping his promise, and Musa apologizes and asks Khidr to leave him if he again questions Khidr. Both of them travel on until they happened upon a village. They ask the villagers for food, but the inhabitants refuse to entertain them as guests. They see therein a wall which is about to collapse, and Khidr repairs the wall. Musa asks Khidr why he had repaired the wall when the inhabitants refuse to entertain them as guests and  give them food. Musa states that Khidr could have taken wages for his work.

Khidr informs Musa that they are now to part ways as Musa has broken his promise. Khidr then explains each of his actions. He informs Musa that he had broken the ship with the adze because a ruler who reigns in those parts took all functional ships by force; Khidr has created a defect in order to prevent their ship from being taken by force. Khidr then explains that he has killed the child because he was mischievous and disobedient to his parents, and Khidr fears that the child would overburden them with his disobedience, and explained that God would replace him with a better one who is more obedient and has more affection. Khidr then explains that he has fixed the wall because it belongs to two helpess children whose father is pious. God wishes to reward them for their piety. Khidr states that there is a treasure hidden underneath the wall, and by repairing the wall, the wall would break in the future, and when dealing with the broken wall, the orphans would find the treasure.

Other incidents 
The sayings of Muhammad (hadith), Islamic literature and Quranic exegesis also narrate some incidents of the life of Musa. One story goes that he is bathing apart from the other Israelites who all bathe together. This leads the Bani Israel to say that Musa does so due to a scrotal hernia. One day, when Musa is bathing in seclusion, he puts his clothes on a stone, and the stone flees with his clothes. Musa rushes after the stone, and when the Bani Israel see him, they say, 'By God, Musa has got no defect in his body". Musa then beats the stone with his clothes, and Abu Huraira states, "By God! There are still six or seven marks present on the stone from that excessive beating". In a hadith, Muhammad states that the stone still has three to five marks due to Musa hitting it.

Death

Harun dies shortly before Musa. It is reported in a Sunni hadith that when Azrael, the Angel of Death, comes to Musa, Musa slaps him in the eye. The angel returns to God and tells Him that Musa does not want to die. God tells the angel to return and tell Musa to put his hand on the back of an ox, and for every hair that comes under his hand, he would be granted a year of life. When Musa asks God what would happen after the granted time, God informs him that he would die after the period. Musa, therefore, requests God for death at his current age near the Promised Land "at a distance of a stone's throw from it."

Burial place

A side road to the right of the main Jerusalem-Jericho road, about  beyond the sign indicating sea level, leads to the site. The Fatimid, Taiyabi and Dawoodi Bohra sects also believe in the same.

The main body of the present shrine, mosque, minaret and some rooms were built during the reign of Baibars, a Mamluk Sultan, in 1270 AD. Over the years Nabi Musa was expanded, protected by walls, and includes 120 rooms in its two levels which hosted the visitors.

Martyrdom 
Moreover, by indicating that Musa wants to be separated from Harun, his brother, many of the Israelites proclaim that Musa had killed Harun on the mountain to secure this so-called separation. However, according to the accounts of al-Tabari, Harun dies of natural causes: “When they [Musa and Harun] fell asleep, death took Harun.... When he was dead, the house was taken away, the tree disappeared, and the bed was raised to heaven”. When Musa returns to the Children of Israel, his followers, from the mountain without Harun, they are found saying that Musa killed Harun because he envied their love for Harun, for Harun was more forbearing and more lenient with them. This notion would strongly indicate that Musa could have indeed killed Harun to secure the separation for which he prayed to God. To redeem his faith to his followers though, al-Tabari quotes Musa by saying “He was my brother. Do you think that I would kill him?” As stated in the Shorter Encyclopedia of Islam, it was recorded that Musa recited two rak’ahs to regain the faith of his followers. God answers Musa’ prayers by making the bed of Harun descend from heaven to earth so that the Children of Israel could witness the truth that Harun died of natural causes.

The unexpected death of Harun appears to make the argument that his death is merely an allusion to the mysterious and miraculous death of Musa. In the accounts of Musa’ death, al-Tabari reports, “[W]hile Musa was walking with his servant Joshua, a black wind suddenly approached. When Joshua saw it, he thought that the Hour—the hour of final judgement—was at hand. He clung to Musa…. But Musa withdrew himself gently from under his shirt, leaving it in Joshua’s hand”. This mysterious death of Musa is also asserted in Deuteronomy 34:5, “And Musa the servant of the LORD died there in Moab”. There is no explanation to why Musa may have died or why Musa may have been chosen to die: there is only this mysterious “disappearance”. According to Islamic tradition, Musa is buried at Maqam El-Nabi Musa, Jericho.

Although the death of Musa seems to be a topic of mysterious questioning, it is not the main focus of this information. However, according to Arabic translation of the word martyr, shahid—to see, to witness, to testify, to become a model and paradigm –  is the person who sees and witnesses, and is therefore the witness, as if the martyr himself sees the truth physically and thus stands firmly on what he sees and hears. To further this argument, in the footnotes of the Quran translated by M.A.S. Abdel Haleem, “The noun shahid is much more complex than the term martyr….The root of shahid conveys ‘to witness, to be present, to attend, to testify, and/or to give evidence’”. Additionally, Haleem notes that the martyrs in the Quran are chosen by God to witness Him in Heaven. This act of witnessing is given to those who are “given the opportunity to give evidence of the depth of their faith by sacrificing their worldly lives, and will testify with the prophets on the Day of Judgment”. This is supported in 3:140: “…if you have suffered a blow, they too have the upper hand. We deal out such days among people in turn, for God to find out who truly believes, for Him to choose martyrs from among you…”

It is also stated in the Quran that the scriptures in which Musa brings forth from God to the Children of Israel are seen as the light and guidance of God himself (Quran 6:91). This strongly indicates that Musa dies as a martyr: Musa dies being a witness to God; Musa dies giving his sacrifice to the worldly views of God; and Musa dies in the act of conveying the message of God to the Children of Israel. Although his death remains a mystery and even though he did not act in a religious battle, he does in fact die for the causation of a Religious War, a war that showcases the messages of God through scripture.

In light of this observation, John Renard claims that Muslim tradition distinguishes three types of supernatural events: “the sign worked directly by God alone; the miracle worked through a prophet; and the marvel effected through a non-prophetic figure”. If these three types of supernatural events are put into retrospect with the understanding of martyrdom and Musa, the aspect of being a martyr plays out to resemble the overall understanding of what “Islam” translates to. The concept of martyrdom in Islam is linked with the entire religion of Islam. This whole process can be somehow understood if the term 'Islam' is appreciated. This is because being a derivate of the Arabic root salama, which means "surrender" and "peace", Islam is a wholesome and peaceful submission to the will of God. Just like Musa is an example of the surrender to God, the term "martyr" further reinforces the notion that through the signs, the miracle, and the marvel, the ones chosen by God are in direct correlation to the lives of the prophets.

In conclusion, although the death of Musa is a mysterious claim by God. The framework of Musa describes the spiritual quest and progress of the individual soul as it unfolds to reveal the relationship to God. Nevertheless, because of his actions, his ability to be a witness and his success at being a model for the Children of Israel his life were a buildup to the ideals of martyrdom. His death and his faithful obligations toward God have led his mysterious death to be an example of a true prophet and a true example of a martyrdom.

Isra and Mi'raj
During his Night Journey (Isra), Muhammad is known to have led Musa along with Jesus, Abraham and all other prophets in prayer. Musa is mentioned to be among the prophets who Muhammad meets during his ascension to heaven (Mi'raj) alongside Gabriel.

Musa and Muhammad are reported to have exchanged greetings with each other, and Musa is reported to have cried due to the fact that the followers of Muhammad are going to enter Heaven in greater numbers than his followers. When God enjoins fifty prayers to the community to Muhammad and his followers, Muhammad once again encounters Musa, who asks what has been commanded by God. When Musa is told about the fifty prayers, he advises Muhammad to ask a reduction in prayers for his followers. When Muhammad returns to God and asks for a reduction, he is granted his request. Once again, he meets Musa, who again inquires about the command of God. Despite the reduction, Musa again urges Muhammad to ask for another reduction. Muhammad again returns and asks for a reduction. This continues until only five prayers are remaining. When Musa again tells Muhammad to ask for a reduction, Muhammad replies that he is shy of asking again. Therefore, the five prayers are finally enjoined upon the Muslim community.

In Islamic thought

Musa is revered as a prominent prophet and messenger in Islam, and his narrative is recounted the most among the prophets in the Quran. He is regarded by Muslims as one of the five most prominent prophets in Islam, along with Jesus (Isa), Abraham (Ibrahim), Noah (Nuh) and Muhammad. These five prophets are known as Ulu’l azm prophets, the prophets who are favored by God and are described in the Quran to be endowed with determination and perseverance. Islamic tradition describes Musa being granted many miracles, including a glowing hand and a staff that turns into a snake. The life of Musa is often described as a parallel to that of Muhammad. Both are regarded as being ethical and exemplary prophets. Both are regarded as lawgivers, ritual leaders, judges and the military leaders for their people. Islamic literature also identifies a parallel between their followers and the incidents of their history. The exodus of the Israelites is often viewed as a parallel to the migration of the followers of Muhammad. The drowning and destruction of the Pharaoh and his army is also described to be a parallel to the Battle of Badr. In Islamic tradition, Musa is especially favored by God and converses directly with Him, unlike other prophets who receives revelation by God through an intervening angel. Musa receives the Torah directly from God. Despite conversing with God, the Quran states that Musa is unable to see God. For these feats Musa is revered in Islam as Kalim Allah, meaning the one who talks with God.

Revealed scripture

In Islam, Musa is revered as the receiver of a scripture known as the Torah (Tawrat). The Quran describes the Torah as “guidance and a light" for the Israelites and that it contains teachings about the Oneness of God (Tawhid), prophethood and the Day of Judgment. It is regarded as containing teachings and laws for the Israelites which are taught and practiced by Musa and Harun to them. Among the books of the complete Hebrew Bible (Genesis, Deuteronomy, Numbers, Leviticus and Exodus), only the Torah is considered to be divinely revealed instead of the whole Tanakh or the Old Testament. The Quran mentions that the Ten Commandments are given to the Israelites through Musa, and the Commandments contain guidance and understanding of all things. The Torah was the "furqan", meaning difference, a term which is regarded as having used for itself as well. Musa preaches the same message as Muhammad, and the Torah foretells the arrival of Muhammad. Modern Muslim scholars such as Mark N. Swanson and David Richard Thomas cite Deuteronomy 18:15–18 as foretelling the arrival of Muhammad.

Some Muslims believe that the Torah has been corrupted (tahrif). The exact nature of the corruption has been discussed among scholars. The majority of Muslim scholars, including Ibn Rabban and Ibn Qutayba, have stated that the Torah had been distorted in its interpretation rather than in its text. The scholar Tabari considered the corruption to be caused by distortion of the meaning and interpretation of the Torah. Tabari considered the learned rabbis of producing writings alongside the Torah, which were based on their own interpretations of the text. The rabbis then reportedly "twisted their tongues" and made them appear as though they were from the Torah. In doing so, Al-Tabari concluded that they added to the Torah what was not originally part of it, and these writings were used to denounce the prophet Muhammad and his followers. Tabari also states that these writings of the rabbis were mistaken by some Jews to be part of the Torah. A minority view held among scholars such as Al-Maqdisi is that the text of the Torah itself was corrupted. Maqdisi claimed that the Torah had been distorted in the time of Musa, by the seventy elders when they came down from Mount Sinai. Maqdisi states that the Torah was further corrupted in the time of Ezra, when his disciples made additions and subtractions in the text narrated by Ezra. Maqdisi also stated that discrepancies between the Jewish Torah, the Samaritan Torah and the Greek Septuagint point to the fact that the Torah was corrupted. Ibn Hazm viewed the Torah of his era as a forgery and considered various verses as contradicting other parts of the Torah and the Quran. Ibn Hazm considered Ezra as the forger of the Torah, who dictates the Torah from his memory and made significant changes to the text. Ibn Hazm accepted some verses which, he stated, foretold the arrival of Muhammad.

In religious sects
Sunni Muslims fast on the Ashura (the tenth day of Muharram, the first month in the Hijri calendar as similar to Yom Kippur which is on the tenth day of Tishrei, and the first month of the Hebrew civil year) to commemorate the liberation of the Israelites from the Pharaoh. Shia Muslims view Musa and his relation to Harun as a prefiguration of the relation between Muhammad and his cousin, Ali ibn Abi Talib. Ismaili Shias regard Musa as 4th in the line of the 7 'speaking prophets' (natiq), whose revealed law was for all believers to follow. In Sufism, Musa is regarded as having a special position, being described as a prophet as well as a spiritual wayfarer. The author Paul Nwyia notes that the Quranic accounts of Musa have inspired Sufi exegetes to "meditate upon his experience as being the entry into a direct relationship with God, so that later the Sufis would come to regard him as the perfect mystic called to enter into the mystery of God". Muslim scholars such as Norman Solomon and Timothy Winter state without naming that some Sufi commentators excuse Musa from the consequence of his request to be granted a vision of God, as they consider that it is "the ecstasy of hearing God which compelled him to seek completion of union through vision". The Quranic account of the meeting of Musa and Khidr is also noted by Muslim writers as being of special importance in Sufi tradition. Some writers such as John Renard and Phyllis G. Jestice note that Sufi exegetes often explain the narrative by associating Musa for possessing exoteric knowledge while attributing esoteric knowledge to Khidr. The author John Renard states that Sufis consider this as a lesson, "to endure his apparently draconian authority in view of higher meanings".

In Islamic literature

Musa is also revered in Islamic literature, which narrates and explains different parts of the life of Musa. Persian Muslim scholar and mystic Rumi, who titles Musa as the "spirit enkindler", also includes a story of Musa and the shepherd in his book, the Masnavi. The story narrates the horror of Musa, when he encounters a shepherd who is engaged in anthropomorphic devotions to God. Musa accuses the shepherd of blasphemy; when the shepherd repents and leaves, Musa is rebuked by God for "having parted one of His servants from Him". Musa seeks out the shepherd and informs him that he was correct in his prayers. The authors Norman Solomon and Timothy Winter regard the story to be "intended as criticism of and warning to those who in order to avoid anthropomorphism, negate the Divine attributes". Rumi mainly mentions the life of Musa by his encounter with the burning tree, his white hand, his struggle with the Pharaoh and his conversation with God on Mount Sinai. According to Rumi, when Musa came across the tree in the valley of Tuwa and perceived the tree consumed by fire, he in fact saw the light of a "hundred dawns and sunrises". Rumi considered the light a "theater" of God and the personification of the love of God. Many versions of the conversation of Musa and God are presented by Rumi; in all versions Musa is commanded to remove his footwear, which is interpreted to mean his attention to the world. Rumi commented on Quran  considering the speech of God to be in a form accessible only to prophets instead of verbal sounds. Rumi considers the miracles given to Musa as assurance to him of the success of his prophethood and as a means of persuasion to him to accept his mission. Rumi regarded Musa as the most important of the messenger-prophets before Muhammad.

The Shi'a Quranic exegesis scholar and thinker Muhammad Husayn Tabatabaei, in his commentary Balance of Judgment on the Exegesis of the Qur'an attempted to show the infallibility of Musa in regard to his request for a vision of God and his breaking of his promise to Khidr as a part of the Shi'a doctorine of prophetic infallibility (Ismah). Tabatabaei attempted to solve the problem of vision by using various philosophical and theological arguments to state that the vision for God meant a necessary need for knowledge. According to Tabatabaei, Musa was not responsible for the promise broken to Khidr as he had added "God willing" after his promise. The Islamic reformist and activist Sayyid Qutb, also mentions Musa in his work, In the Shade of the Quran. Sayyid Qutb interpreted the narrative of Musa, keeping in view the sociological and political problems facing the Islamic world in his era; he considered the narrative of Musa to contain teachings and lessons for the problems which faced the Muslims of his era. According to Sayyid Qutb, when Musa was preaching to the Pharaoh, he was entering the "battle between faith and oppression". Qutb believed that Musa was an important figure in Islamic teachings as his narrative symbolized the struggle to "expel evil and establish righteousness in the world" which included the struggle from oppessive tyrants, a struggle which Qutb considered was the core teaching of the Islamic faith.

The Sixth Imam, Ja'far al-Sadiq, regarded the journey of Musa to Midian and to the valley of Tuwa as a spiritual journey. The turning of the face of Musa towards Midian is stated to be the turning of his heart towards God. His prayer to God asking for help of is described to be his awareness of his need. The commentary alleged to the Sixth Imam then states the command to remove his shoes symbolized the command to remove everything from his heart except God. These attributes are stated to result in him being honoured by God's speech. The Andalusian Sufi mystic and philosopher, Ibn Arabi wrote about Musa in his book The Bezels of Wisdom dedicating a chapter discussing "the Wisdom of Eminence in the word of Musa". Ibn Arabi considered Musa to be a "fusion" of the infants murdered by the Pharaoh, stating that the spiritual reward which God had chosen for each of the infants manifested in the character of Musa. According to Ibn Arabi, Musa was from birth an "amalgam" of younger spirits acting on older ones. Ibn Arabi considered the ark to be the personification of his humanity while the water of the river Nile to signifiy his imagination, rational thought and sense perception.

During the 20th century the story of Musa's confrontation with Pharaoh has been invoked by Islamists to justify their opposition to “disbelieving” secular regimes and tyrannical rulers. Sayyid Qutb (d. 1966) and Jihad movements in Egypt condemned Jamal Abd al-Nasir (d. 1970) and Anwar al-Sadat (d. 1981), both presidents of Egypt, for being equivalents to the unbelieving Pharaoh who opposed Musa; members of the Jihad Group assassinated al-Sadat for being a disbeliever. During the Iranian revolution of 1978–79, government troops were cautioned not to "Kill Musa [members of the Islamic opposition] for the sake of Pharaoh [the Shah’s regime]."

Appearance 
In Muhammad al-Bukhari's book Sahih al-Bukhari, in Chapter 55, Hadith 648, Musa is depicted by Muhammad after the Night of Ascension, narrarated by Ibn Umar:

According to Ibn ‘Abbaas, Muhammad reported, "On the night of my Ascent to Heaven, I saw Moosa (Moses), who was a tall, brown man..." [Al-Bukhari and Muslim].

Quranic references
Musa is referenced many times in the Quran:
Appraisals of Musa: 2:136; 4:164; 6:84; 6:154; 7:134; 7:142; 19:51; 20:9; 20:13; 20:36; 20:41; 25:35; 26:1; 26:21; 27:8; 28:7; 28:14; 33:69; 37:114; 37:118; 44:17
Musa' attributes: 7:150, 20:94, 28:15, 28:19, 28:26
Musa' prophecy: 7:144, 20:10-24, 26:10, 26:21, 27:7-12, 28:2-35, 28:46, 79:15-19
The prophet whom God spoke to: Q2:253, 4:164, 7:143-144, 19:52, 11-24, 20:83-84, 26:10-16, 27:8-11, 28:30-35, 28:46, 79:16-19
The Torah: Q2:41-44; 2:53; 2:87; 3:3; 3:48; 3:50; 3:65; 3:93; 5:43-46; 5:66-68; 5:110; 6:91; 6:154-157; 7:145; 7:154-157; 9:111; 11:110; 17:2; 21:48; 23:49; 25:3; 28:43; 32:23; 37:117; 40:53; 41:45; 46:12; 48:29; 53:36; 61:6; 62:5; 87:19
The valley: Q20:12, Q20:20, Q28:30, Q79:16
Musa' miracle: Q2:56, Q2:60, Q2:92, Q2:211, Q7:107-108, Q7:117-120, Q7:160, Q11:96, Q17:101, Q20:17-22, Q20:69, Q20:77, Q26:30-33, Q26:45, Q26:63, Q27:10-12, Q27:12, Q28:31-32, Q40:23, Q40:28, Q43:46, Q44:19, Q44:33, Q51:38, Q79:20
Musa and the Pharaoh
Musa' life inside the palace: 20:38-39, 26:18, 28:8-12
Returned to his mother: Q20:4, Q28:12-13
God's revelation to Musa' mother: Q20:38-39, Q28:7-10
Musa' preaching: Q7:103-129, Q10:84, Q20:24, Q20:42-51, Q23:45, Q26:10-22, Q28:3, Q43:46, Q44:18, Q51:38, Q73:15-17
Musa met the Pharaoh: Q20:58-59, Q20:64-66, Q26:38-44
The Pharaoh's magicians: Q7:111-116, Q10:79-80, Q20:60-64, Q26:37-44
Musa vs. the magicians: Q7:115-122, Q10:80-81, Q20:61-70, Q26:43-48
Dispute among the magicians: Q20:62, Q26:44-47
Musa warned the magicians: Q10:81, Q20:61
Musa and Harun were suspected to be magicians too: Q7:109, Q7:132, Q10:7-77, Q17:101, Q20:63, Q40:24, Q43:49
Belief of the magicians: Q7:119-126, Q20:70-73, Q26:46
The belief of Asiya: Q66:11
Trial to Pharaoh's family: Q7:130-135
Pharaoh's weakness: Q7:103-126, Q10:75, Q11:97-98, Q17:102, Q20:51-71, Q23:46-47, Q25:36, Q26:11, Q26:23-49, Q28:36-39, Q29:39, Q38:12, Q40:24-37, Q43:51-54, Q44:17-22, Q50:13, Q51:39, Q54:41-42, Q69:9, Q73:16, Q79:21-24
Musa and his followers went away: Q20:77, Q26:52-63, Q44:23-24
Musa and his followers were safe: Q2:50, Q7:138, Q10:90, Q17:103, Q20:78-80, Q26:65, Q37:115-116, Q44:30-31
Pharaoh's belief was too late: Q10:90
Pharaoh's and his army: Q2:50, Q3:11, Q7:136-137, Q8:52-54, Q10:88-92, Q17:103, Q20:78-79, Q23:48, Q25:36, Q26:64-66, Q28:40, Q29:40, Q40:45, Q43:55-56, Q44:24-29, Q51:40, Q54:42, Q69:10, Q73:16, Q79:25, Q85:17-18, Q89:13
Believer among Pharaoh's family: Q40:28-45
The Pharaoh punished the Israelites: Q2:49, Q7:124-141, Q10:83, Q14:6, Q20:71, Q26:22, Q26:49, Q28:4, Q40:25
The Pharaohs and Haman were among the rejected: Q10:83, Q11:97, Q28:4-8, Q28:32, Q28:42, Q29:39, Q40:36, Q44:31
Musa killed an Egyptian: Q20:40, Q26:19-21, Q28:15-19, Q28:33
Musa' journey to Median:
Musa and Jethro: Q28:25-28
Musa and two daughters of Shoaib.: Q28:23-27
The people who insulted Musa:Q33:69
Travel to the Promised Land
The Israelites entered the Promised Land: Q2:58, Q5:21-23,
Musa' dialogue with God: Q2:51, Q7:142-143, Q7:155, Q20:83-84
The Israelites worshipped the calf: Q2:51-54, Q2:92-93, Q4:153, Q7:148-152, Q20:85-92
Seven Israelites with Musa met God: Q7:155
Musa and Samiri: Q20:95-97
God manifested himself to the mountain: Q7:143
Refusal of the Israelites: Q2:246-249, Q3:111, Q5:22-24, Q59:14
Attributes of the Israelites: Q2:41-44; 2:55-59; 2:61-71; 2:74-76; 2:83; 2:93-6; 2:100-101; 2:104; 2:108; 2:140-142; 2:246-249; Q3:24; Q3:71; Q3:75; Q3:112; Q3:181; Q3:183; Q4:44; Q4:46-47; Q4:49; Q4:51; Q4:53-54; Q4:153; Q4:155-156; Q4:161; Q5:13; Q5:20; Q5:24; Q5:42-43; Q5:57-58; Q5:62-64; Q5:70; Q5:79-82; Q7:134; Q7:138-139; Q7:149; Q7:160; Q7:162-163; Q7:169; Q9:30; Q9:34; Q16:118; Q17:4; Q17:101; Q20:85-87; Q20:92; Q58:8; Q59:14
Musa and Khidir: Q18:60-82
Qarun: Q28:76-82, Q29:39-40

See also

 Aaron
 Amram
 Burning bush
 
 Jochebed
 Miriam
 Moses in Judeo-Hellenistic literature
 Moses in rabbinic literature
 Prophets and messengers in Islam
 Scrolls of Moses
 Ten Commandments
 Torah in Islam

References

External links
The Quranic Verses About Musa
Detailed Islamic Narrative of Musa by Ibn Kathir
Muslim view of Musa

 
Hebrew Bible prophets of the Quran
One Thousand and One Nights characters